People with the surname McGeary include:

Clarence McGeary (1926-1993), American footballer
Liam McGeary (b. 1982), English martial artist
Mike McGeary (1851-1933), American baseball player
Dean McGeary (b. 1985), Bastion Cycles founder

See also
Geary (surname)